Hamamelis × intermedia, the hybrid witch hazel, is a flowering plant in the family Hamamelidaceae. It is a hybrid of garden origin between H. japonica and H. mollis. Its Latin name refers to its intermediate appearance between those two species.

The yellow, orange or red flowers with twisted petals appear on bare stems in midwinter through early spring.

Numerous cultivars have been developed, many of them prized as garden subjects. The following have gained the Royal Horticultural Society's Award of Garden Merit:- 

'Angelly' 
’Aphrodite’ 
'Arnold Promise' 
’Aurora’ 
'Barmstedt Gold' 
'Diane' 
’Frederic’ 
’Harry’ 
'Jelena' 
'Pallida' 
‘Robert’ 
’Rubin’ 
’Vesna’

Gallery

References

Hamamelidaceae
Hybrid plants